Ramarathnam Sankaran (born 12 June 1931), popularly known as Ra. Sankaran, is an Indian actor and director. He acted in supporting roles in many Tamil films and few Telugu films. Sankaran is a cousin of actor Javar Seetharaman. He has assisted several directors. He is also called as Sankara Iyer.

Filmography

Director

Actor

References

1931 births
Living people
Tamil male actors
Place of birth missing (living people)
Indian film directors
Tamil film directors
Indian male film actors
Male actors in Tamil cinema